Sean Patrick Cunningham (born January 24, 1993) is an American soccer player who is a free agent after being released from Molde in July 2013.

Career 
Cunningham was born in Troy, Michigan, and played soccer with Derby County Wolves Soccer Club and originally committed to play at the University of Michigan before he signed for Molde ahead of the 2011 season. He has not yet made his debut for Molde in the league, but played three matches in the 2011 Norwegian Cup. Ahead of the 2012 season, Ole Gunnar Solskjær the manager of Molde, stated that he wanted Cunningham on loan to another Tippeliga-club during the season to get match-training. On 7 March 2012 it was announced that Cunningham had joined Stabæk on a season-long loan deal. In at the start of the 2013 season, Cunningham trained with IL Hødd. In July 2013, Cunningham was released from his contract with Molde with six months remaining and returned to the United States.

Following Cunningham's release from Molde, he went on trial with Seattle Sounders, playing in a reserve fixture in July 2013.

Career statistics 
Updated on July 21, 2013

Source: nifs.no

References

External links 
 

1993 births
Living people
People from Troy, Michigan
Soccer players from Michigan
American soccer players
Molde FK players
Stabæk Fotball players
Eliteserien players
American expatriate soccer players
Expatriate footballers in Norway
American expatriate sportspeople in Norway
United States men's under-20 international soccer players
Association football defenders